Radio Nacional is a Spanish free-to-air radio station owned and operated by Radio Nacional de España (RNE), the radio division of state-owned public broadcaster Radiotelevisión Española (RTVE). It is the corporation's flagship radio station, and is known for broadcasting mainstream and generalist programming, including news bulletins, current affairs, sports and entertainment.

It was launched on 19 January 1937 as Franco's official radio under the department of propaganda during the Spanish Civil War. The station was initially simply referred to as "Radio Nacional de España". It received other names, such as "RNE 1" from 1988 until 1999 and "Radio 1" from 1999 until 2008 when it adopted its current name "Radio Nacional".

Its headquarters and main production center is in Casa de la Radio at Prado del Rey in Pozuelo de Alarcón. Although almost all its programming is in Spanish and is the same for all of Spain, RNE has territorial centers in every autonomous community and produces and broadcasts some local programming in regional variations in each of them, such as local news bulletins, in the corresponding co-official language.

Selected frequencies

Logos and identities

See also
 Radio Nacional de España
 List of radio stations in Spain

External links
Official Website 

Radio stations established in 1937
Radio stations in Spain
RTVE
News and talk radio stations